Bryan Burrough (born August 13, 1961, in Tennessee) is an American author and correspondent for Vanity Fair. He has written six books.  Burrough was a reporter for The Wall Street Journal in Dallas, Texas, between 1983 and 1992.  He has written for Vanity Fair since 1992. While reporting for The Wall Street Journal, he won the Gerard Loeb Award for excellence in financial journalism three times.  Burrough has written a number of book reviews and op-ed articles for publications such as The New York Times, Los Angeles Times, and The Washington Post. He has also made appearances on Today, Good Morning America, and many documentaries.

Education

Burrough obtained his degree from the University of Missouri School of Journalism in 1983.

Family
He stated in a Book TV interview on C-SPAN 2 with Joe Barton that he was born in Memphis, Tennessee but moved to Temple, Texas when he was seven years old.  He lived in Summit, New Jersey with his wife Marla and their two sons, Dane and Griffin, until they divorced. He now lives in Texas.

Works 
Books non-fiction
 Barbarians at the Gate: The Fall of RJR Nabisco (1990, with John Helyar)
 Vendetta: American Express and the Smearing of Edmond Safra (1992)
 Dragonfly: NASA and the Crisis Aboard Mir (1998)
 Public Enemies: America's Greatest Crime Wave and the Birth of the FBI, 1933–34 (2004)
 The Big Rich: The Rise and Fall of the Greatest Texas Oil Fortunes (2009)
 Days of Rage: America's Radical Underground, the FBI, and the Forgotten Age of Revolutionary Violence (2015)
 Forget the Alamo: The Rise and Fall of an American Myth (2021, with Chris Tomlinson and Jason Stanford)   

Other writing:
 "Texas Has Had Its Day in the Political Sun" (February 22, 2009). The Washington Post

Adaptations 

 Public Enemies. Was based on his book Public Enemies: America’s Greatest Crime Wave and the Birth of the FBI, 1933–34
 Barbarians at the Gate. Was based on his book Barbarians at the Gate: The Fall of RJR Nabisco.

Awards

 1989 Gerald Loeb Award for Deadline and/or Beat Writing for coverage of the RJR Nabisco buyout (shared with John Helyar)
 1991 Gerald Loeb Award for Large Newspapers for the story "The Vendetta"
 1994 Gerald Loeb Award for Magazines for the story "Divided Dynasty"

References

External links
 
 

1961 births
Living people
20th-century American writers
21st-century American non-fiction writers
The Wall Street Journal people
Vanity Fair (magazine) people
20th-century American journalists
American male journalists
Missouri School of Journalism alumni
Gerald Loeb Award winners for Deadline and Beat Reporting
Gerald Loeb Award winners for Large Newspapers
Gerald Loeb Award winners for Magazines